The 2023 Ontario Scotties Tournament of Hearts, the provincial women's curling championship for Southern Ontario, was held from January 23 to 29 at The Plex in Port Elgin, Ontario.  The winning Rachel Homan rink represented Ontario at the 2023 Scotties Tournament of Hearts, Canada's national women's curling championship in Kamloops, British Columbia where they made the Championship round losing to Nova Scotia 7–6 in an extra end.

The event was held in conjunction with the 2023 Ontario Tankard, the provincial men's curling championship. Both events are held together in non-Olympic years.

Qualification process
Twelve teams qualified for the 2023 Ontario Scotties. As defending champions, Team Rachel Homan earned the first qualification spot (due to COVID-19 the 2022 Ontario Hearts were postponed until after the national Tournament of Hearts). One team qualified via their results in the "Grand Slam" series events (2022 PointsBet Invitational, 2022 National, 2022 Tour Challenge, 2022 Masters). Two teams qualified via their results in the Trillium Tour '1000' series events (Stu Sells Toronto Tankard, Stroud Sleeman Cash Spiel, North Grenville Curling Club Women's Fall Classic, Stu Sells Brantford Nissan Classic). Three teams qualified via their results in the Trillium Tour '500' series events (Gord Carroll Curling Classic, KW Fall Classic, CurlON Women's Open, Home Again Women's Classic, plus the aforementioned 1000 events). One team (restricted to curlers under the age of 25) qualified via their results in the aforementioned Trillium Tour events, plus the CurlON 250 Event #1. The remaining four teams qualified via an open qualifier.

Teams
The teams are listed as follows:

Round-robin standings
Final round-robin standings

Round-robin results
All draws are listed in Eastern Time (UTC−05:00).

Draw 1
Monday, January 23, 7:30 pm

Draw 2
Tuesday, January 24, 9:30 am

Draw 3
Tuesday, January 24, 2:30 pm

Draw 4
Tuesday, January 24, 7:30 pm

Draw 5
Wednesday, January 25, 9:30 am

Draw 6
Wednesday, January 25, 2:30 pm

Draw 8
Thursday, January 26, 9:30 am

Draw 9
Thursday, January 26, 2:30 pm

Draw 10
Thursday, January 26, 7:30 pm

Draw 11
Friday, January 27, 9:30 am

Tiebreaker
Friday, January 27, 7:30 pm

Championship round
Records from Round Robin carry over to the Championship Round

Championship round results

Draw 13
Friday, January 27, 7:30 pm

Draw 14
Saturday, January 28, 9:30 am

Draw 15
Saturday, January 28, 2:30 pm

Tiebreaker
Saturday, January 28, 8:00 pm

Playoffs

Source:

Semifinal
Sunday, January 29, 10:30 am

Final
Sunday, January 29, 3:00 pm

Qualification

Open Qualifier
January 7–8, Midland Curling Club, Midland

Notes

References

Bruce County
Ontario Scotties Tournament of Hearts
Ontario Tankard
Ontario Tankard
2023 Scotties Tournament of Hearts